N71 may refer to:

Roads 
 N71 road (Ireland)
 Nebraska Highway 71, in the United States

Other uses 
 N71 (Long Island bus)
 Nokia N71, a mobile phone
 , a submarine of the Royal Navy